Hypericum scopulorum is a species of flowering plant in the family Hypericaceae. It is endemic to Socotra, an island archipelago that is part of Yemen. It is a common plant in shrubland habitat, and it is a dominant species in some areas along with Cephalocroton and another local endemic, Helichrysum rosulatum.

References

scopulorum
Endemic flora of Socotra
Least concern plants
Taxonomy articles created by Polbot
Taxa named by Isaac Bayley Balfour